Sturzkampfgeschwader 160 (St.G.160) (160th Dive Bomber Squadron) was a dive bomber unit of the Luftwaffe during World War II. The regiment was formed on 1 November 1938 with only one group; the latter was renamed Stukageschwader 1st Group on May 1, 1939.

References  

World War II
Luftwaffe Divisions